The 2011 PTT-EGAT World Cup was a professional non-ranking team snooker tournament that took place from 11 to 17 July 2011 at the Bangkok Convention Centre in Bangkok, Thailand. It was the 13th edition of the event, and it was televised live by Eurosport.

The tournament was last held 1996 in Thailand, where Scotland consisting of Stephen Hendry, John Higgins and Alan McManus defeated Ireland, represented by Ken Doherty, Fergal O'Brien and Michael Judge, 10–7 in the final.

Ding Junhui and Liang Wenbo won the first title for China by defeating Northern Ireland, represented by Mark Allen and Gerard Greene, 4–2 in the final.

Prize fund
 
Winner: $200,000
Runner-Up: $100,000
Semi-final: $60,000
Quarter-final: $30,000
Third in group: $15,000
Fourth in group: $12,500
Fifth in group: $7,500
Highest break, round robin stage: $5,000
Highest break, knock-out stage: $15,000
Total: $700,000

Format
Twenty teams of two players each participated in the tournament. The top eight nations were seeded. As the host nation, Thailand was represented by two teams. The teams were drawn into four groups of five. The top two teams in each group have gone through to the quarter-finals.  Each match included singles and doubles frames.

Round robin stage
Each match consisted of five frames and all frames were played. Each player played one frame against each player in the other team plus one doubles frame.

Frames were played in following order:
Singles (Player 1 vs. Player 1)
Singles (Player 2 vs. Player 2)
Doubles (alternate visits)
Reverse singles (Player 1 vs. Player 2)
Reverse singles (Player 2 vs. Player 1)

One point was awarded in the group for every frame won. If two teams were tied on the same number of points following the group stage then the winner of the match between those two teams was ranked higher in the group. Players were not permitted to play consecutive frames in singles matches.

Knock-out stage
Matches were played over the best of 7 frames with a singles frame to determine winner if match was tied at 3 frames each. Players were not permitted to play consecutive frames in singles matches.

Frames were played in following order:
Singles (Player 1 vs. Player 1)
Singles (Player 2 vs. Player 2)
Doubles (alternate visits)
Reverse singles (Player 1 vs. Player 2)
Reverse singles (Player 2 vs. Player 1)
Doubles (alternate visits)
Singles (players nominated by captain).

Teams and seeding

Round robin stage

Group A

Group B

Group C

Group D

Knock-out stage

Quarter-finals

Semi-finals

Final

Century breaks 
There were 12 century breaks in the tournament. 
  B – 139 Passakorn Suwannawat
  – 128, 108 Mark Allen, 109 Gerard Greene, –  110 Mark Allen & Gerard Greene (Doubles Frame alternate shots)
  – 125 Stephen Maguire
  – 120 Ding Junhui
  – 111 Ken Doherty, 101 Fergal O'Brien
  – 102 Mark Selby
  – 100 Tony Drago
  – 100 Luca Brecel

References

External links

World Cup (snooker)
World Cup
World Cup (snooker)
Cue sports competitions in Thailand
Sport in Bangkok
July 2011 sports events in Thailand